Venezuela competed at the 2014 Summer Youth Olympics, in Nanjing, China from 16 August to 28 August 2014.

Medalists

Archery

Venezuela qualified two archers from its performance at the American Continental Qualification Tournament.

Individual

Team

Athletics

Venezuela qualified eight athletes.

Qualification Legend: Q=Final A (medal); qB=Final B (non-medal); qC=Final C (non-medal); qD=Final D (non-medal); qE=Final E (non-medal)

Boys
Track & road events

Field Events

Girls
Track & road events

Field events

Basketball

Venezuela qualified a boys' and girls' team from their performance at the 2013 3x3 World Tour Final.

Skills Competition

Boys' Tournament

Roster
 Cristhian Centeno
 Garmendia Daniel
 Adrian Espinoza
 Jose Materan

Group Stage

Knockout Stage

Girls' Tournament
Roster
 Laury Garcia
 Montilla Maria
 Givanna Padilla
 Genesis Rivera

Group Stage

Knockout Stage

Beach Volleyball

Venezuela qualified a boys' team from their performance at the 2014 CSV Youth Beach Volleyball Tour.

Cycling

Venezuela qualified a girls' team based on its ranking issued by the UCI.

Team

Mixed Relay

Football

Venezuela qualified 1 girls' team by virtue of winning the 2013 South American Under-17 Women's Championship

Girls' Tournament

Roster

 Valentina Bonaiuto
 Iceis Briceno
 Nayluisa Caceres
 Yenleidys Caldoza
 Argelis Campos
 Deyna Castellanos
 Olimar Castillo
 Leidy Delpino
 Nikol Gonza
 Fatima Lobo
 Sandra Luzardo
 Greisbell Marquez
 Maria Ortegano
 Nathalie Pasquel
 Katherine Portillo
 Yuleisi Rivero
 Estefania Sequera
 Hilary Vergara

Group stage

Semi-final

Gold medal match

Golf

Venezuela qualified one team of two athletes based on the 8 June 2014 IGF Combined World Amateur Golf Rankings.

Individual

Team

Judo

Venezuela qualified two athletes based on its performance at the 2013 Cadet World Judo Championships.

Individual

Team

Modern Pentathlon

Venezuela qualified one athlete based on its performance at the PANAM YOG Qualifiers.

Sailing

Venezuela was given a reallocation boat based on being a top ranked nation not yet qualified. Later they were given a reallocation spot based on being a top ranked nation not yet qualified.

Swimming

Venezuela qualified four swimmers.

Boys

Girls

Table Tennis

Venezuela qualified one athlete based on its performance at the Latin American Qualification Event.

Singles

Team

Qualification Legend: Q=Main Bracket (medal); qB=Consolation Bracket (non-medal)

Triathlon

Venezuela qualified two athletes based on its performance at the 2014 American Youth Olympic Games Qualifier.

Individual

Relay

Weightlifting

Venezuela qualified 1 quota in the boys' events and 1 quota in the girls' events based on the team ranking after the 2013 Weightlifting Youth World Championships.

Boys

Girls

Wrestling

Venezuela qualified three athletes based on its performance at the 2014 Pan American Cadet Championships.

Boys

Girls

References

2014 in Venezuelan sport
Nations at the 2014 Summer Youth Olympics
Venezuela at the Youth Olympics